Imelchol Village, also spelled Imechal, is a village in Peleliu, Palau. It is located near Kloulklubed and Koska.

See also
List of cities, towns and villages in Palau

References

Sources

Peleliu
Populated places in Palau